The 2002–03 English Hockey League season took place from September 2002 until May 2003.

The men's title was won by Cannock with the women's title going to Slough. There were no playoffs to determine champions after the regular season but there was a competition for the top four clubs called the Premiership tournament which culminated with men's & women's finals on 5 May.

The Men's Cup was won by Reading and the Women's Cup was won by Canterbury.

Men's Premier Division League Standings

Women's Premier Division League Standings

Men's Premiership Tournament

Women's Premiership Tournament

Men's Cup (EHA Cup)

Quarter-finals

Semi-finals

Final 
(Held at the Canterbury on 13 April)

Reading
Simon Mason, Rob Todd, Jon Wyatt, Ben Barnes, Rhys Joyce, Simon Towns, Manpreet Kochar, Richard Mantell, Mark Pearn, Ken Robinson, Jonty Clarke. Subs: Adam Mulholland, Howard Hoskin, Andy Watts, Scott Ashdown, Dave Cooper
Cannock
James Fair, Andrew Humphrey, Simon Ramsden, Andrew West, Craig Parnham, Matthew Taylor, Michael Johnson, Ben Sharpe, Andrew Brogdon, Scott Cordon, Martin Jones. Subs: Barry Middleton, Chris Mayer, James Tweddle, Richard Lane, Andrew Gooderham
Scorers
Mantell, Robinson, Ashdown, Hoskin / Lane

Women's Cup (EHA Cup)

Quarter-finals

Semi-finals

Final 
(Held at Canterbury on 13 April)

Canterbury
Natalie Westcar, Frances Houslop, Susan Webber, Mel Clewlow, Lucy Burr, Nicky Litchfield, Jackie Laslett, S Sutton, Anna Bennett, Vanessa Lines, Jenny Wilson. Subs: Tasha Brennan, Alice Dunn, Juliet Chapman, Christina Houslop, Hayley Brown
Slough
Beth Storry, Lisa Scarborough, Kate Walsh, Fiona Greenham, Lucy Newcombe, Sue Chandler, A Brown, Carol Voss, Lucy Bevan, Vicky Goodacre, Alex Scott. Subs: Sarah Kelleher, L Walton, Lesley Hobley, L Smith
Scorers
Webber, Bennett (2), Clewlow

References 

2002
field hockey
field hockey
2002 in field hockey
2003 in field hockey